Chawri Bazar is an underground station located on the Yellow Line of the Delhi Metro, a rapid transit system serving Delhi and its satellite cities in the National Capital Region of India. It is located in the Chawri Bazaar locality of Old Delhi and was inaugurated on 3 July 2005 as part of the Kashmere Gate – Central Secretariat corridor.

The station
It is located close to the monuments of Jama Masjid, the largest mosque in India and Red Fort, a UNESCO World Heritage Site.

Station layout

See also
List of Delhi Metro stations
Transport in Delhi
Delhi Metro Rail Corporation
Delhi Suburban Railway
Delhi Transport Corporation
North Delhi
National Capital Region (India)
List of rapid transit systems
List of metro systems

References

External links

 Delhi Metro Rail Corporation Ltd. (Official site) 
 Delhi Metro Annual Reports
 
 UrbanRail.Net – descriptions of all metro systems in the world, each with a schematic map showing all stations.

Delhi Metro stations
Railway stations opened in 2005
Railway stations in Central Delhi district